The 1970–71 season of the European Cup Winners' Cup football club tournament was won by Chelsea in a replay against Real Madrid. Defending champions Manchester City were eliminated by Chelsea in the semi-finals, only the second ever tie in the competition between two clubs from the same country. These two sides would later compete in the 2021 UEFA Champions League final, with Chelsea winning 1–0. The finals were played in Karaiskakis Stadium in Piraeus, Greece.

Bracket

Preliminary round 

|}

First round

|}

First leg

Second leg

CSKA September Flag won 11–1 on aggregate.

Steaua București won 4–3 on aggregate.

1–1 on aggregate; Vorwärts Berlin won on away goals.

Second round

|}

First leg

Second leg

Chelsea won 2–0 on aggregate.

PSV Eindhoven won 7–0 on aggregate.

Quarter-finals

|}

Semi-finals 

|}

First leg

Second leg

Chelsea won 2–0 on aggregate.

Real Madrid won 2–1 on aggregate.

Final

Replay

See also
1970–71 European Cup
1970–71 Inter-Cities Fairs Cup

References

External links 
1970-71 competition at UEFA website
Cup Winners' Cup results at Rec.Sport.Soccer Statistics Foundation
Cup Winners Cup Seasons 1970-71–results, protocols
website Football Archive 1970–71 Cup Winners Cup

3
UEFA Cup Winners' Cup seasons